The Country Dance and Song Society (abbreviated CDSS) is a nonprofit organization that seeks to promote participatory dance, music, and song with English and North American roots.

History

CDSS began in 1915 as a series of American chapters of the English Dance and Folk Society established by Cecil Sharp. The organization consolidated in 1940 and grew steadily through the present. Today, it supports over 300 local affiliate groups.

Leadership
 

Bob Dalsemer, (1990-1996)

Activities

CDSS promotes a number of types of traditional dance, including contra dance, English country dance, Scottish country dance, square dance, morris dance, rapper sword, and clogging.

CDSS runs several sessions annually at Pinewoods Dance Camp and other sites.

References

External links
Country Dance and Song Society website

Social dance
Contra dance
Square dance
English folk dance
English folk music
Arts organizations established in 1915
Dance organizations
Music organizations based in the United States
Non-profit organizations based in Massachusetts